Valmaine Toki is a New Zealand barrister and solicitor, and professor of law at the University of Waikato, New Zealand.

Early life and education
Toki is a Māori woman, a member of the Ngati Wai, Ngāpuhi and Ngati Whatua iwi. Toki was the first New Zealander appointed as an expert member on the United Nations Permanent Forum on Indigenous Issues. 

She studied law at the University of Auckland, followed by a master's degree in business administration at the University of Tasmania, Australia. Her master's focused on marine resource management.

As part of Toki's doctoral research into the disproportionate offending rates of Māori people in the New Zealand criminal justice system, she travelled to Asia and North America to study community court systems. She completed her PhD in 2016.

Career
Toki worked for Te Ohu Kai Moana Trustee Ltd on Māori fisheries, aquaculture, and asset allocation. In 2007 she was appointed to a lecturer position at the University of Auckland and taught in the areas of contemporary Treaty of Waitangi and Māori issues, jurisprudence and legal method.

Her book Indigenous courts, self-determination and criminal justice advocates for the establishment of a marae-based  Indigenous court in New Zealand.

Selected publications

References

Living people
Academic staff of the University of Waikato
University of Auckland alumni
University of Tasmania alumni
21st-century New Zealand lawyers
Ngāpuhi people
Year of birth missing (living people)